Catocala lineella, the lineella underwing, little lined underwing or steely underwing, is a moth of the family Erebidae. The species was first described by Augustus Radcliffe Grote in 1872. It is found in North America from Ontario and Quebec south to Florida west to Texas and north to Ohio.

It was considered to be a subspecies or even a synonym of Catocala amica for a long time.

The wingspan is 35–40 mm. Adults are on wing from July to August.

The larvae feed on the leaves of Quercus species.

References

External links
Species information
Catocala (amica) lineella information

lineella
Moths described in 1872
Moths of North America